XHWE-FM is a radio station on 107.9 FM in Irapuato, Guanajuato. XHWE is owned by Radio Grupo Antonio Contreras and is known as WE!, La Estación Familiar (The Family Station) with a talk format.

The WE! name is also used on co-owned XEMAS-AM 1560 in Salamanca.

History
XEWE-AM received its concession on October 28, 1941, broadcasting with 100 watts on 1420 kHz. It was owned by Felipe Gallardo. It later expanded to 10,000 watts day and then 1,000 watts night.

XEWE migrated to FM in 2011.

References

Radio stations in Guanajuato
Radio stations established in 1941